A Thousand Months is a 2003 French-Moroccan drama film directed by Faouzi Bensaïdi. It was screened in the Un Certain Regard section at the 2003 Cannes Film Festival.

Cast
 Fouad Labied as Mehdi
 Nezha Rahile as Amina
 Mohamed Majd as Grandfather
 Mohammed Afifi as Houcine
 Abdelati Lambarki as Caid
 Mohamed Bastaoui as Caid's Brother
 Brahim Khai as The moqadam
 Abdellah Chicha as Abdelhadi
 Mohamed Choubi as Marzouk, primary school teacher
 Hajar Masdouki as Saadia
 Meryem Massaia as Malika
 Nabila Baraka as Lalla hnia
 Mohammed Talibi as The Kaid
 Faouzi Bensaïdi as Samir
 Rachid Bencheikh as The shepherd

References

External links

2003 films
2000s French-language films
2003 drama films
Films directed by Faouzi Bensaïdi
French drama films
Moroccan drama films
2000s French films